The Pretty Things is the self-titled debut album by the English rock band Pretty Things, which features mostly R&B and rock and roll cover versions. A re-issue released in 2000 on CD featured every track from both the American and British versions of the album.

The liner notes were written by Jimmy Duncan and Bryan Morrison.

2011 release 
The album was released as part of a two CD package with the follow-up album Get the Picture? as the pretty things get the picture? Both CDs include bonus cuts.

Track listing

UK track listing 
Side one
"Road Runner" (Ellas McDaniel) – 3:14
"Judgement Day" (Bryan Morrison; adapted and arranged by the Pretty Things) – 2:49
"13 Chester Street" (Phil May, Dick Taylor, Brian Pendleton, John Stax, Vivian Prince) – 2:22
"Big City" (Jimmy Duncan, Alan Klein) – 2:02
"Unknown Blues" (May, Taylor, Pendleton, Stax, Prince) – 3:49
"Mama, Keep Your Big Mouth Shut" (Ellas McDaniel) – 3:03

Side two
"Honey, I Need" (Dick Taylor, John Warburton, Peter Leslie Smith, Ian Stirling) – 2:00 (credited: Dick Taylor, Button, Smithing)
"Oh, Baby Doll" (Chuck Berry) – 3:01
"She's Fine, She's Mine" (Ellas McDaniel) – 4:24
"Don't Lie to Me" (Tampa Red) – 3:53
"The Moon Is Rising" (Jimmy Reed) – 2:33
"Pretty Thing" (Willie Dixon) – 1:39

US track listing 
Side one
"Honey, I Need" (Taylor, Warburton, Smith) – 1:58
"Rosalyn" (Jimmy Duncan, Bill Farley) – 2:20
"13 Chester Street" (May, Taylor, Pendleton, Stax, Prince) – 2:20
"I Can Never Say" (May, Taylor, Pendleton, Stax, Prince) – 3:00
"Unknown Blues" (May, Taylor, Pendleton, Stax, Prince) – 2:35
"The Moon Is Rising" (Reed) – 2:30

Side two
"Don't Bring Me Down" (Johnnie Dee) – 2:09
"Road Runner"(McDaniel) – 3:13
"We'll Be Together" (May, Taylor, Stax) – 2:09
"Judgement Day" (May, Taylor, Pendleton, Stax, Prince) – 2:45
"Big City" (Duncan, Klein) – 2:30
"Pretty Thing" (Dixon) – 1:39

2000 CD remastered track listing 
"Road Runner" (McDaniel) – 3:14
"Judgement Day" (Morrison) – 2:49
"13 Chester Street" (May, Taylor, Pendleton, Stax, Prince) – 2:22
"Big City" (Duncan, Klein) – 2:02
"Unknown Blues" (May, Taylor, Pendleton, Stax, Prince) – 3:49
"Mama, Keep Your Big Mouth Shut" (McDaniel) – 3:03
"Honey, I Need" (Taylor, Warburton, Smith) – 2:00
"Oh, Baby Doll" (Berry) – 3:01
"She's Fine, She's Mine" (McDaniel) – 4:24
"Don't Lie to Me" (Berry) – 3:53
"The Moon Is Rising" (Reed) – 2:33
"Pretty Thing" (Dixon) – 1:39
"Rosalyn" (Duncan, Farley) – 2:20
"Big Boss Man" (Luther Dixon, Al Smith) – 2:39
"Don't Bring Me Down" (Johnnie Dee) – 2:09
"We'll Be Together" (May, Taylor, Stax) – 2:09
"I Can Never Say" (May, Taylor, Pendleton, Stax, Prince) – 2:37
"Get Yourself Home" (May, Taylor, Pendleton, Stax, Prince) – 2:14

Personnel 
The Pretty Things
 Phil May – lead vocals
 Dick Taylor – lead guitar
 Brian Pendleton – rhythm guitar, backing vocals
 John Stax – bass guitar, harmonica, backing vocals
 Viv Prince – drums
 Bobby Graham – drums

Charts 
The Pretty Things reached number six and spent 10 weeks on the UK Albums Chart in 1965.

References 

1965 debut albums
Pretty Things albums
Fontana Records albums
Albums produced by Bobby Graham
Philips Records albums
Repertoire Records albums
Sundazed Records albums
Norton Records albums
Victor Entertainment albums